Robb Armstrong is an African American cartoonist, best known for creating the comic strip Jump Start. His comic strip Jump Start is the most widely syndicated daily strip by an African American in the world.

Early life and education
Armstrong was born on March 4, 1962, in West Philadelphia, Pennsylvania. Armstrong's mother, Dorothy was a seamstress. He was the youngest of the five children.

Armstrong attended the Shipley School in Bryn Mawr. During the senior year of high-school he completed a three-week internship with cartoonist Signe Wilkinson. He studied advertising design at the College of Visual and Performing Arts at Syracuse University and graduated with a Bachelor of Fine Arts degree.

Career

Early career
During college, he began submitting his comic Hector to The Daily Orange his freshman year and later became art director at the newspaper. Hector was a cynical, lazy black college kid who is accompanied by Meatball and Julias; a dog with human ears. When this character didn't work well outside the college boundaries, he worked over the next four year to reshape Hector into Jump Start. During his early years as a cartoonist, he held a day-job at Weightman advertising in Philadelphia.

Jump Start
Jump Start, Armstrong's comic strip revolves around the trials and tribulations of a middle-class Black family in Philadelphia that is made up of Joseph "Joe" Cobb Sr., a city police officer, and Marcy Cobb, a nurse and their four children. The family is named after the Cobbs Creek neighborhood located in West Philadelphia.

After being picked for syndication by United Feature Syndicate in October 1989, the cartoon appeared in 69 papers within six months of launch. Since the launch in 1989 around 10,000 comics have been created. As of 2018, it is syndicated in over 300 newspapers throughout North America, including The Los Angeles Times, New York Daily News, and  The Boston Globe.

In 2020, Armstrong stated that he is working on a possible live action comedy television show based on Jump Start.

Other work
In October 2010, Armstrong's work was featured in The Original Art of the Funny Papers exhibition at Syracuse university's XL Projects gallery in Armory Square. On May 19, 2012, Armstrong received an honorary Doctor of Humane Letters, Honoris causa degree from Holy Family University in Pennsylvania.

In 2016, Armstrong published a part self-help book, part memoir titled Fearless: A Cartoonist's Guide to Life.

Influence
Armstrong lists Charles M. Schulz as one of his influences and heroes, saying that he started drawing sketches of Charlie Brown at age five. As part of the 1994 animated television special You're in the Super Bowl, Charlie Brown, Schulz gave his Franklin, the Peanuts strip's Black character, the surname Armstrong, after Robb Armstrong.

Personal life 
Armstrong has two children and is married to Crystal D. Armstrong, an events planner. They reside in Burbank, California.

Publications

References

External links

Billy Ireland Cartoon Library & Museum Art Database

Living people
1962 births
African-American comics creators
American comics creators
American comic strip cartoonists
American comics artists
Artists from Philadelphia
Syracuse University College of Visual and Performing Arts alumni
21st-century African-American people
20th-century African-American people